Morocco competed at the 2022 World Championships in Athletics in Eugene, Oregon, United States. The country is currently in 22nd place in the medal table.

Medalists

Results
Morocco has entered 15 athletes.

Men 
Track and road events

Women 
Track and road events

References

Morocco
World Championships in Athletics
2022